INS Malvan was an Indian Naval minesweeper, named after a port in Malabar coast Malvan. She remained in service until decommissioned at Naval Base, Kochi on 5 January 2003.

References

Mahé-class minesweepers